Bewlay Lake is a lake located on Vancouver Island south of west end of Sarita Lake and east of Bamfield.

References

Alberni Valley
Lakes of Vancouver Island
Barclay Land District